ACK or Ack may refer to:

Arts and entertainment

 Amar Chitra Katha, an Indian comic book series

Technology
 Acknowledgement (data networks)
 ACK (TCP), the control character used in the Transmission Control Protocol to acknowledge receipt of a packet

 Amsterdam Compiler Kit, a retargetable compiler suite and toolchain

Transportation
 Acklington railway station (Station code: ACK), a rail station in the UK
 Armstrong Whitworth F.K.8, an early aircraft known as the "Big Ack"
 Nantucket Airlines or ACK Air, an American airline
 Nantucket Memorial Airport (IATA: ACK, FAA LID: ACK), an airport in the US

Other uses

 Assumption College, Kilmore, an Australian school
 Aka-Kora language (ISO 639-3: ack), an extinct Great Andamanese language
 TNK2 or ACK or ACK1, an enzyme that in humans is encoded by the TNK2 gene

See also
 "Ack ack", from signalese for AA, referring to anti-aircraft artillery fire
 Andrew Haldane (1917–1944), an officer in the US Marine Corps in the Pacific Theatre, World War II nicknamed "Ack-Ack"
 Acknowledgment (disambiguation)